Kolkata, India, is largely inhabited by the ethnic community of the native Bengalis (both Ghoti and Bangal origin) respectively. According to a report by the Indian Statistical Institute owned by the Government of India, the Kolkata city had a population of 4.5 million as of 2011 out of which the population of native Bengalis in Kolkata is almost 62% which comprised the majority of the city's population, whereas ethnic groups like Marwaris, Biharis and Urdu-speaking Muslims together forming 36% of the population which comes under the category of large minorities. Other Various micro-minority communities of Kolkata include as far as concerned follows -: Sindhi people, Pathan people, Marathi people, Odia people, Gujarati people, Kashmiri people, Punjabi people, Nepalis, Telugus, Tamil, Anglo-Indian, Iraqis, Jewish, Armenian, Tibetan, Greek,  Parsi, Chinese, and Iraqi people etc.

Chinese

Chinatown in the eastern part of the city of Kolkata is the only Chinatown in India. Once home to 20,000 ethnic Chinese, its population dropped to around 2,000 as of 2009 as a result of multiple factors including repatriation and denial of Indian citizenship following the 1962 Sino-Indian War, and immigration to foreign countries for better economic opportunities. The Chinese community traditionally worked in the local tanning industry and ran Chinese restaurants.

Iraqis

Iraqis first arrived in Kolkata during late 19th century from Eastern Uttar Pradesh state of India.Today majority are in the leather work of the city. Most of them live in areas of Park Circus and Topsia. The present Iraqi population in Kolkata is estimated to be 10,000.

Jewish

Kolkata's Jews are mostly Baghdadi Jews who came to Kolkata to trade. At one point as strong as 6000, the community has dwindled to about 60 after the formation of Israel. Today there are only about 30 Jews left in Kolkata. The first recorded Jewish immigrant to Kolkata was Shalon Cohen in 1798 from Aleppo in present-day Syria. The most influential Jewish family in Kolkata was perhaps the father-son real estate magnates David Joseph Ezra and Elia David Ezra. They were behind such buildings as the Chowringhee Mansions, Esplanade Mansions and the synagogue Neveh Shalom.the family also were instrumental in the founding of the Jewish Girls School.  Ezra Street in Kolkata is named after them. The community has five independent synagogues in Kolkata, including one in Chinatown, some of which are still active today. The Jewish confectioner Nahoum's in the New Market holds a special place in Kolkata confectionery. Founded in 1902, Nahoum's moved to its present location in the New Market in 1916. It is run today by the original owner's grandson, David Nahoum. A Jewish wedding in Kolkata after a gap of 50 years in the 1990s received a lot of media attention. After the establishment of Israel, many Kolkatan Jews left to live in Israel and the size of the Jewish community had a severe decrease.

Armenian

The Armenians followed the land route through Bactria to trade with India from ancient times. They were known as the "Merchant Princes of India", and some settled in Emperor Akbar's court. Some finally settled in Serampore and Kolkata, supposedly under the invitation of Job Charnock.

Among notable Armenians, Sir Apcar Alexander Apcar, a prominent businessman, was the head of the Bengal Chamber of Commerce and Industry. The size of the Armenian community can be testified by the five Armenian cemeteries in Kolkata, including the one adjunct to the Chapel of Holy Trinity in Tangra and an Armenian church. A gift of Rs. 8000 by Asvatoor Mooradkhan helped found the Armenian College in 1821. Armenian College has been instrumental in pioneering the game of rugby on the Maidan turf.

The Armenians settled in a block close to Free School Street, which even to this day is called Armani-para ("the neighbourhood of the Armenians"). They have mostly assimilated into the Indian population, and the community has now been reduced to a handful of houses.

Tibetan
The Tibetans were initially annual winter visitors to Kolkata who, along with the Bhutias, vended woollens. Post 1951, Kolkata became home to quite a few Tibetans who used the porous Sikkim-Tibet border to get to Kolkata. Winter sees large numbers of Tibetans set up winter garment streetside shops in the area around Wellington Square. The Tibetan community has also contributed to a large number of Tibetan restaurants serving ethnic Tibetan cuisine. Tibetan medicine is well accepted in Kolkata as alternative therapy to terminal illnesses.

Afghans
Kolkata was a popular destination for Afghan (including Pathan) businessmen from Afghanistan in the 19th century, vending spices and fruits. They are locally known as the Kabuliwala, named after the 1892 story which tells the story of a migrant from Kabul to Kolkata, and are also nicknamed as the Khans like elsewhere in India.

Greek
The Greeks emigrated to India after the Ottoman and Turkish invasions in the 16th century. Kolkata had a sizeable Greek community, mostly a close-knit clan of noble families from the Greek island of Chios, pursuing trade with the British. The firm of Ralli Brothers is perhaps the most common Greek name in Kolkata; the Rallis sold their firm in the 1960s after Indian independence and moved away, like most of the Greek community. The firm is now known as Ralli India, under the Tata Group of companies. The Greek community was centred on Amratollah Street around the Greek Church of the Transfiguration (built in 1782). The most famous Greek to hail from Kolkata possibly was the gifted violinist Marie Nicachi who embarked on a European tour in 1910 and played at the courts of Emperor Franz Josef of Austria and Tsar Nicholas II of Russia. She settled in her familial home of Corfu after World War I. The Greek contribution to the city will be remembered by the pioneering social work at the Greek Orthodox Church and the Panioty Fountain in the Maidan—named after Demetrius Panioty, personal secretary to the "friend of India," Lord Ripon.

See also

Chinese of Calcutta
 Religion in West Bengal

References

External links
 Greek Cemetery Kolkata
 Chinese New Year 2015 in Kolkata
 Chinese in Kolkata
 https://web.archive.org/web/20100121071143/http://calcutta-armenians.blog.co.uk/
 https://web.archive.org/web/20090207105027/http://calcutta-armenians.blog.co.uk/2005/10/01/the_vanishing_calcutta_armenians~211029/
Photos of Parsi Fire Temple, Calcutta
Photos of Synagogues, Calcutta
Photos of Chinese Temple, calcutta
Photos of Chinese New Year
 Chinese New New Year and Lion Dance Display in Kolkata

Demographics of India